Pauline Hanson (born 15 October 1955), formerly Pauline Elliott, is a New Zealand former professional tennis player.

Hanson represented the New Zealand Federation Cup team from 1975 to 1977, featuring in eight rubbers. She played in the singles main draws of both the US Open and Australian Open in 1977.

During the 1980s she moved to the United States and has been a longtime tennis pro at the Rolling Hills Club in Novato, California. She has competed as a marathon runner and had a quick enough time to qualify for the 1984 United States Olympic Trials, although as a New Zealand national she was unable to participate. Since then she has become a U.S. citizen and is married to local television reporter Jack Hanson.

References

External links
 
 
 

1955 births
Living people
New Zealand female tennis players
American people of New Zealand descent